Isaac Eleazar Hernández Fernández (born 30 April 1990) is a Mexican ballet dancer and actor who is a lead principal with the English National Ballet.

Early life
Isaac Hernández was born in Guadalajara, Mexico, one of 11 children of Hector Hernández, a former dancer. One of his brothers, Esteban Hernandez, is a principal dancer with the San Francisco Ballet. He was taught dance by his parents at age 8 in the family backyard. He then trained at Philadelphia's The Rock School for Dance Education.

Dancing career
Hernandez first danced at the ABT II. In 2008, he joined San Francisco Ballet's corps de ballet and was promoted to soloist in 2010. He joined the Dutch National Ballet as a soloist in 2012, and was promoted to principal dancer the following year after dancing the role of Prince Désiré in The Sleeping Beauty. After making a guest appearance in Swan Lake with the English National Ballet, he joined the company as a lead principal in 2015. His repertoire there also includes classical works such as Romeo and Juliet and La Sylphide, as well as contemporary works including Aszure Barton’s Fantastic Beings and Akram Khan's Giselle.

As a guest artist he has appeared at the Paris Opera Ballet as Solor in La Bayadère and in Nureyev’s Don Quixote, and at the Rome Opera in Baryshnikov and Laurent Hilare's version of Don Quixote.

In 2015, he was called "the hottest ballet boy to hit London since Carlos Acosta".

In 2018, Hernandez won the Prix Benois de la Danse for his performance in Don Quixote with the Rome Opera Ballet and La Sylphide with the ENB. He is the first Mexican dancer to win the award.

He is an arts and tourism ambassador of Mexico and the youngest artist to receive an outstanding artist award from the Mexican president. Hernandez and his brother Esteban set up a project in their hometown of Guadalajara to bring other dancers to perform and teach at workshops.

Acting career
Hernandez had his acting debut in Carlos Saura's movie The King of All the World. He then acted in Manolo Caro's limited series for Netflix Someone Has To Die in the role of Lázaro, a ballet dancer. The series premiered on 16 October 2020.

Select repertoire 
Hernández's repertoire includes:

Awards 
Awards: 
Alexandra Radius Award for Most Outstanding Dancer
Gold Medal, USA International Ballet Competition
Bronze Medal and special award, Kirov Ballet at Moscow’s International Ballet Competition
First place in the Cuba International Competition
2018 Benois de la Danse at the Bolshoi Theatre

Personal life
Hernández is married to San Francisco Ballet's artistic director Tamara Rojo. They have one son together.

References

English National Ballet principal dancers
Living people
Mexican male ballet dancers
People from Guadalajara, Jalisco
Dutch National Ballet principal dancers
San Francisco Ballet soloists
Mexican expatriates in the United States
Mexican expatriates in the Netherlands
Mexican expatriates in the United Kingdom
1990 births
Prix Benois de la Danse winners